

Incumbents
 Monarch – Catherine II

Events

 
 Minsk Governorate
 Orthodox Eparchy of Minsk and Slutsk
 Second Partition of Poland

Births

 Jafargulu Bakikhanov (1793-1867) - Azerbaijani noble who became a Russian general
 Maria Danilova (1793-1810) - ballet dancer
 Apollon Galafeyev (1793-1853) - general
 Nikolay Kobozev (1793-1866) - merchant, first mayor of Berdiansk
 Karl Eduard von Napiersky (1793-1864) - Latvian historian
 Pavel Pestel (1793-1826) - revolutionary, Decembrist
 Feodor Pryanishnikov (1793-1867) - post office administrator and reformer
 Elena Yezhova (1793-1853) - opera singer and actress

Deaths
 Karl Blank (1728-1793) - architect
 Mikhail Krechetnikov (1729-1793) - general

References

1793 in Russia
Years of the 18th century in the Russian Empire